Westchester Magazine is a magazine and website that covers news, culture, lifestyle, nightlife, shopping, and other local information within Westchester County, New York. It is published monthly by Today Media, LLC, a company located in Rye, NY. Its circulation in 2023 is 47,000. Their annual sales are estimated to be between $5 and $10 million with a staff between 50 and 100. Westchester Magazine was relaunched in 2001. It is a member of the City and Regional Magazine Association (CRMA).

The magazine publishes the "Best of Westchester" where it rates shops and restaurants in various categories. The magazine hosts an annual event and party called Best of Westchester which highlights many of the winners from that year's issue. The website gives a breakdown of restaurants, nightlife, shopping & styles, and neighborhoods.

Staff
 Angelo R. Martinelli - Chairman of the Board of Today Media, LLC
 Ralph A. Martinelli - Publisher & President Today Media, LLCC
 John Bruno Turiano - Editor

References

External links

See also
Hudson Valley (magazine)
New York (magazine)
The New Yorker
The New-York Magazine

Monthly magazines published in the United States
Local interest magazines published in the United States
Magazines established in 2001
Magazines published in New York (state)
Westchester County, New York